Pseudauchen is a monotypic genus of worms belonging to the family Rhadinorhynchidae. The only species is Pseudauchen epinepheli.

References

Monotypic animal genera
Rhadinorhynchidae
Acanthocephala genera